Ramnagar Assembly constituency is an assembly constituency in Purba Medinipur district in the Indian state of West Bengal.

Overview
As per orders of the Delimitation Commission, No. 217 Ramnagar Assembly constituency is composed of the following: Ramnagar I and Ramnagar II community development blocks

Ramnagar Assembly constituency is part of No. 31 Kanthi (Lok Sabha constituency).

Election results

2021

2016

2011

  

.# Swing calculated on Congress+Trinamool Congress vote percentages taken together in 2006.

1977-2006
In the 2006 state assembly elections, Swadesh Ranjan Nayak of CPI(M) won the Ramnagar assembly seat defeating his nearest rival Akhil Giri of Trinamool Congress. Contests in most years were multi cornered but only winners and runners are being mentioned. Akhil Giri of Trinamool Congress defeated Samares Das of CPI(M) in 2001. Mrinal Kanti Roy of CPI(M) defeated Dipak Das of Congress in 1996 and 1991. Sudhir Kumar Giri of CPI(M) defeated Hemanta Dutta of Congress in 1987. Abanti Mishra of Congress defeated Balai Lal Das Mahapatra, Independent, in 1982. Balai Lal Das Mahapatra of Janata Party defeated Rohini Karan of CPI(M) in 1977.

1951-1972
Hemanta Dutta of Congress won in 1972. Radha Gobinda Bishal of Congress (Organisation) won in 1971. Balai Lal Das Mahapatra of PSP won in 1969. Trailokya Nath Pradhan of Congress won in 1967, 1962, 1957 and in independent Indias's first election in 1951.

References

Assembly constituencies of West Bengal
Politics of Purba Medinipur district